Häpna is a Swedish record label. It has released records by Toshiya Tsunoda, Sagor & Swing, Eric Malmberg, Hans Appelqvist and Tape.

References

External links
Häpnas website
Häpna at MySpace
Music Guide to Häpna at pontone.pl

Swedish record labels